Shamsabad (also Romanized as Shamsābād) is a village in Hasanabad Rural District of Fashapuyeh District of Ray County, Tehran province, Iran. At the 2006 National Census, its population was 2,278 in 717 households. The following census in 2011 counted 2,624 people in 959 households. The latest census in 2016 showed a population of 1,464 people in 546 households; it was the largest village in its rural district.

References 

Ray County, Iran

Populated places in Tehran Province

Populated places in Ray County, Iran